Kate Bell may refer to:

 Kate Bell (Australian actress) (born 1983), Australian actress in film and television
 Kate Bell (British actress) (born 1981), British actress, known for her role in the TV series Grange Hill
 Kate Atkinson Bell (1907–2003), American educator
 Kate Bell (businesswoman), British businesswoman
 Kate Bell (trade unionist), British trade unionist and Assistant General Secretary of the Trades Union Congress

See also
Katy Bell (disambiguation)
Katherine Bell (disambiguation)
Catherine Bell (disambiguation)